Shlach, Shelach, Sh'lah, Shlach Lecha, or Sh'lah L'kha ( or  — Hebrew for "send", "send to you", or "send for yourself") is the 37th weekly Torah portion (parashah) in the annual Jewish cycle of Torah reading and the fourth in the Book of Numbers. Shelach is the sixth and lecha is the seventh word in the parashah. The parashah tells the story of the twelve spies sent to assess the promised land, commandments about offerings, the story of the Sabbath violator, and the commandment of the fringes (tzitzit).

The parashah constitutes . It is made up of 5,820 Hebrew letters, 1,540 Hebrew words, 119 verses, and 198 lines in a Torah Scroll (Sefer Torah). Jews generally read it in June or early July.

Readings

First reading — Numbers 13:1–20
In the first reading, God told Moses to send one chieftain from each of the 12 tribes of Israel to scout the land of Canaan, and Moses sent them out from the wilderness of Paran. Among the scouts were Caleb, son of Jephunneh from the Tribe of Judah and Hosea (Hoshea), son of Nun from the Tribe of Ephraim. Moses changed Hosea's name to Joshua. Moses asked for an assessment of the geographical features of the land, the strength and numbers of the population, the agricultural potential and actual performance of the land, civic organization (whether their cities were like camps or strongholds), and forestry conditions. He also asked them to be positive in their outlook and to return with samples of local produce.

Second reading — Numbers 13:21–14:7
In the second reading, they scouted the land as far as Hebron. At the wadi Eshcol, they cut down a branch with a single cluster of grapes so large that it had to be borne on a carrying frame by two of them, as well as some pomegranates and figs. At the end of 40 days, they returned and reported to Moses, Aaron, and the whole Israelite community at Kadesh, saying that the land did indeed flow with milk and honey (date honey) but that the people who inhabited it were powerful, the cities were fortified and very large, and that they saw the Anakites there. Caleb hushed the people and urged them to go up and take the land. But the other scouts spread calumnies about the land, calling it "one that devours its settlers." They reported that the land's people were giants and stronger than the Israelites. The whole community broke into crying, railed against Moses and Aaron, and shouted: "If only we might die in this wilderness!" Moses and Aaron fell on their faces, and Joshua and Caleb rent their clothes.

Third reading — Numbers 14:8–25
In the third reading, Joshua and Caleb exhorted the Israelites not to fear and not to rebel against God. Just as the community threatened to pelt them with stones, God's Presence appeared in the Tabernacle. God complained to Moses: "How long will this people spurn Me," and threatened to strike them with pestilence and make of Moses a nation more numerous than they. But Moses told God to think of what the Egyptians would think when they heard the news, and how they would think God powerless to bring the Israelites to the Promised Land. Moses asked God to forbear, quoting God's self-description as "slow to anger and abounding in kindness, forgiving iniquity and transgression." In response, God pardoned, but also swore that none of the men who had seen God's signs would see the Promised Land, except Caleb and Joshua.

Fourth reading — Numbers 14:26–15:7
In the fourth reading, God swore that all of the men 20 years old and up, except Caleb and Joshua, would die in the wilderness. God said that the Israelites' children would enter the Promised Land after roaming the wilderness, suffering for the faithlessness of the present generation, for 40 years, corresponding to the number of days that the scouts scouted the land. The scouts other than Caleb and Joshua died of plague. Early the next morning, the Israelites set out to the Promised Land, but Moses told them that they would not succeed without God in their midst. But they marched forward anyway, and the Amalekites and the Canaanites dealt them a shattering blow at Hormah. God told Moses to tell Israelites that when they entered the Promised Land and would present an offering to God, the person presenting the offering was also to bring flour mixed with oil and wine.

Fifth reading — Numbers 15:8–16
In the fifth reading, God told Moses to tell Israelites that when they would present a bull for a burnt offering to God, the person presenting the offering was also to bring flour mixed with oil and wine. And when a resident alien wanted to present an offering, the same law would apply.

Sixth reading — Numbers 15:17–26
In the sixth reading, when the Israelites ate bread of the land, they were to set aside a portion, a dough offering (challah), as a gift to God. If the community unwittingly failed to observe any commandment, the community was to present one bull as a burnt offering with its proper meal offering and wine, and one he-goat as a sin offering, and the priest would make expiation for the whole community and they would be forgiven.

Seventh reading — Numbers 15:27–41
In the seventh reading, if an individual sinned unwittingly, the individual was to offer a she-goat in its first year as a sin offering, and the priest would make expiation that the individual might be forgiven. But the person who violated a commandment defiantly was to be cut off from among his people. Once the Israelites came upon a man gathering wood on the Sabbath day, and they brought him before Moses, Aaron, and the community and placed him in custody. God told Moses that the whole community was to stone him to death outside the camp, so they did so. God told Moses to instruct the Israelites to make for themselves fringes (tzitzit) on each of the corners of their garments. They were to look at the fringes, recall the commandments, and observe them.

Readings according to the triennial cycle
Jews who read the Torah according to the triennial cycle of Torah reading read the parashah according to the following schedule:

In ancient parallels
The parashah has parallels in these ancient sources:

Numbers chapter 13
John A. Wilson suggested that the Anakim may be related to the Iy-‘anaq geographic region named in Middle Kingdom Egyptian (19th to 18th century BCE) pottery bowls that had been inscribed with the names of enemies and then shattered as a kind of curse.

Similarly, the Middle Egyptian (early second millennium BCE) tale of Sinuhe Palestine described the Land of Israel or, as the Egyptian tale called it, the land of Yaa: "It was a good land called Yaa. Figs were in it and grapes. It had more wine than water. Abundant was its honey, plentiful its oil. All kind of fruit were on its trees. Barley was there and emmer, and no end of cattle of all kinds."

In inner-biblical interpretation
The parashah has parallels or is discussed in these Biblical sources:

Numbers chapter 13

Numbers chapter 14
Sommer argued that , for example, quoted , which was already an authoritative and holy text, but revised the morally troubling part: Where  taught that God punishes sin for generations,  maintained that God does not contend forever. Sommer argued that  and  similarly quoted  with revision. Rather, they repeat  while also disagreeing with part of it.

Numbers chapter 15
God states that correct sacrifice was not the taking of a bull out of the sacrificer's house, nor the taking of a goat out of the sacrificer's fold, to convey to God, for every animal was already God's possession. The sacrificer was not to think of the sacrifice as food for God, for God neither hungers nor eats. Rather, the worshiper was to offer to God the sacrifice of thanksgiving and call upon God in times of trouble, and thus God would deliver the worshiper and the worshiper would honor God.

 passage through the desert,
 release from prison,
 recovery from serious disease, and
 surviving a storm at sea.

While  and  set out the procedure for the burnt offering (olah), before then,  reports that Noah offered burnt-offerings (olot) of every clean beast and bird on an altar after the waters of the Flood subsided. The story of the Binding of Isaac includes three references to the burnt offering (olah). In , God told Abraham to take Isaac and offer him as a burnt-offering (olah).  then reports that Abraham rose early in the morning and split the wood for the burnt-offering (olah). And after the angel of the Lord averted Isaac's sacrifice,  reports that Abraham lifted up his eyes and saw a ram caught in a thicket, and Abraham then offered the ram as a burnt-offering (olah) instead of his son.  reports that Moses pressed Pharaoh for Pharaoh to give the Israelites "sacrifices and burnt-offerings" (zevachim v'olot) to offer to God. And  reports that after Jethro heard all that God did to Pharaoh and the Egyptians, Jethro offered a burnt-offering and sacrifices (olah uzevachim) to God.

And then  reports that God had respect for Abel and his offering (minchato), but for Cain and his offering (minchato), God had no respect.

More generally, the Hebrew Bible addressed "sacrifices" (zevachim) generically in connection with Jacob and Moses. After Jacob and Laban reconciled,  reports that Jacob offered a sacrifice (zevach) on the mountain and shared a meal with his kinsmen. And after Jacob learned that Joseph was still alive in Egypt,  reports that Jacob journeyed to Beersheba and offered sacrifices (zevachim) to the God of his father Isaac. And Moses and Aaron argued repeatedly with Pharaoh over their request to go three days' journey into the wilderness and sacrifice (venizbechah) to God.

The Hebrew Bible also includes several ambiguous reports in which Abraham or Isaac built or returned to an altar and "called upon the name of the Lord." In these cases, the text implies but does not explicitly state that the Patriarch offered a sacrifice.

The consistent application of the law regarding sacrifices to both Israelites and the strangers dwelling amongst them reflects the same principle in the Passover regulations in the Book of Exodus.

The ordinances for seeking forgiveness of unintentional sin (Numbers 15:22–29) are a shorter form of the ordinances set out in more detail ordinances in Leviticus 4.

In early nonrabbinic interpretation
The parashah has parallels or is discussed in these early nonrabbinic sources:

Numbers chapter 15
Pseudo-Philo reported that God commanded Moses about the tassels, and then Korah and the 200 men with him rebelled, asking why that unbearable law had been imposed on them.

In classical rabbinic interpretation
The parashah is discussed in these rabbinic sources from the era of the Mishnah and the Talmud:

Numbers chapter 13
Resh Lakish read Moses' recollection of the matter in  that "the thing pleased me well" to mean that agreeing to send the spies pleased Moses well but not God.

Rabbi Isaac said that the spies' names betrayed their lack of faith, and that Sethur's name (in ) meant that he undermined (sathar) the works of God. And Rabbi Joḥanan said that the name of Nahbi the son of Vophsi (in ) meant that he hid (hikbi) God's words.

Whenever he saw that the wine was good, he would direct his men to bring the wine into his house, but when he saw that the wine had turned to vinegar, he would tell his men to take the wine into their houses.

The Midrash explained that they were fools because they spread an evil report about the land, and  says, “He that utters a slander is a fool.” The Midrash reconciled the two characterizations by telling that the spies were great men who then made fools of themselves. Yet Moses did not want to send them on his own responsibility, so he consulted God about each individual, mentioning the name and tribe of each, and God told Moses that each was worthy. The Midrash explained that one can infer that God told Moses that they were worthy, because  reports, “And Moses sent them from the wilderness of Paran according to the commandment of the Lord.” Afterwards, at the end of 40 days, they changed and made all the trouble, causing that generation to be punished; thus  says, “For they are a very contrary (tahpukot) generation,” since when they were selected they were righteous and then they changed (nitapeku). Accordingly,  says, “Send you men,” and afterwards  says, “These are the names of the men.”

A Midrash taught that one should become an explorer for wisdom, as  uses the term.

Rava noted that  literally reads "they went up into the South, and he came to Hebron," and deduced from the change in the number of the pronoun that Caleb separated himself from the spies' plan and prostrated himself in prayer on the graves of the patriarchs in Hebron.

It was also taught that Ahiman built Anath, Sheshai built Alush, and Talmai built Talbush. They were called "the children of Anak" (the giant) because they seemed so tall that they would reach the sun.

The Baraita rejected the plain meaning of "built," reasoning that Ham would not build a house for his younger son Canaan (in whose land was Hebron) before he built one for his elder son Mizraim (in whose land was Zoan), and  lists (presumably in order of birth) "the sons of Ham: Cush, and Mizraim, and Put, and Canaan." The Baraita also taught that among all the nations, there was none more fertile than Egypt, for  says, "Like the garden of the Lord, like the land of Egypt." And there was no more fertile spot in Egypt than Zoan, where kings lived, for  says of Pharaoh, "his princes are at Zoan." But rocky Hebron was still seven times as fertile as lush Zoan.

Rabbi Isaac said that the scouts carried the grapes with a series of balancing poles. The Gemara explained that eight spies carried the grape-cluster, one carried a pomegranate, one carried a fig, and Joshua and Caleb did not carry anything, either because they were the most distinguished of them, or because they did not share in the plan to discourage the Israelites.

Rabbi Joḥanan said in the name of Rabbi Simeon ben Yohai that the words "And they went and came to Moses" in  equated the going with the coming back, indicating that just as they came back with an evil design, they had set out with an evil design.

Once when Rami bar Ezekiel visited Bnei Brak, he saw goats grazing under fig trees while honey was flowing from the figs, and milk dripped from the goats mingling with the fig honey, causing him to remark that it was indeed a land flowing with milk and honey. Rabbi Jacob ben Dostai said that it is about three miles from Lod to Ono, and once he rose up early in the morning and waded all that way up to his ankles in fig honey. Resh Lakish said that he saw the flow of the milk and honey of Sepphoris extend over an area of sixteen miles by sixteen miles. Rabbah bar Bar Hana said that he saw the flow of the milk and honey in all the Land of Israel and the total area was equal to an area of twenty-two parasangs by six parasangs.

Rabbah interpreted  to report that Caleb won the people over with his words, for he saw that when Joshua began to address them, they disparaged Joshua for failing to have children. So Caleb took a different tack and asked, "Is this all that Amram's son [Moses] has done to us?" And as they thought that Caleb was about to disparage Moses, they fell silent. Then Caleb said, "He brought us out of Egypt, divided the sea, and fed us manna. If he were to ask us to get ladders and climb to heaven, should we not obey?

Reading , “The stout-hearted are bereft of sense, they sleep their sleep,” a Midrash taught that the expression “bereft of sense” applied to Moses and Aaron. They sent the spies, who slandered the land, so that they did not know what to do. Moses and Aaron lost courage, but Caleb immediately rose and silenced all of the people, as  reports, “And Caleb stilled (vayahas) the people.” He stood on a bench and silenced them, saying, “Silence (has)!” and they became silent to hear him. Thus  says, “The stout-hearted are bereft of sense.” The Midrash taught that it came to this because the messengers that Moses and Aaron sent were fools. Of such as these  observes, “He that sends a message by the hand of a fool cuts off his own feet, and drinks damage.”

Rabbi Hanina bar Papa read the spies to say in  not "they are stronger than we" but "they are stronger than He," questioning God's power.

The Mishnah thus deduced that one who speaks suffers more than one who acts.

Rav Mesharsheya said that  proved that the spies were liars, for though they might well have known that they saw themselves as grasshoppers, they had no way of knowing how the inhabitants of the land saw them.

Numbers chapter 14
The Torah answered that the man whom God sought to create would be limited in days and full of anger, and would come into the power of sin. Unless God would be long-suffering with him, the Torah continued, it would be well for man not to come into the world. God asked the Torah whether it was for nothing that God is called (echoing ;) "slow to anger" and "abounding in love." God then set about making man.

The Pirke De-Rabbi Eliezer told that after the incident of the Golden Calf, Moses foretold that he would behold God's Glory and make atonement for the Israelites' iniquities on Yom Kippur. On that day, Moses asked God to pardon the iniquities of the people in connection with the Golden Calf. God told Moses that if he had asked God then to pardon the iniquities of all Israel, even to the end of all generations, God would have done so, as it was the appropriate time. But Moses had asked for pardon with reference to the Golden Calf, so God told Moses that it would be according to his words, as  says, "And the Lord said, 'I have pardoned according to your word.'"

A Baraita taught that when Moses ascended to receive the Torah from God, Moses found God writing "longsuffering" among the words with which  describes God. Moses asked God whether God meant longsuffering with the righteous, to which God replied that God is longsuffering even with the wicked. Moses exclaimed that God could let the wicked perish, but God cautioned Moses that Moses would come to desire God's longsuffering for the wicked. Later, when the Israelites sinned at the incident of the spies, God reminded Moses that he had suggested that God be longsuffering only with the righteous, to which Moses recounted that God had promised to be longsuffering even with the wicked. And that is why Moses in  cited to God that God is "slow to anger."

Rabbi Isaac explained with a parable. A king took a wife whom he dearly loved. He became angry with her and left her, and her neighbors taunted her, saying that he would not return. Then the king sent her a message asking her to prepare the king's palace and make the beds therein, for he was coming back to her on such-and-such a day. On that day, the king returned to her and became reconciled to her, entering her chamber and eating and drinking with her. Her neighbors at first did not believe it, but when they smelled the fragrant spices, they knew that the king had returned. Similarly, God loved Israel, bringing the Israelites to Mount Sinai, and giving them the Torah, but after only 40 days, they sinned with the Golden Calf. The heathen nations then said that God would not be reconciled with the Israelites. But when Moses pleaded for mercy on their behalf, God forgave them, as  reports, "And the Lord said: ‘I have pardoned according to your word.'" Moses then told God that even though he personally was quite satisfied that God had forgiven Israel, he asked that God might announce that fact to the nations. God replied that God would cause God's Shechinah to dwell in their midst, and thus  says, "And let them make Me a sanctuary, that I may dwell among them." And by that sign, God intended that all nations might know that God had forgiven the Israelites. And thus  calls it "the Tabernacle of the testimony," because the Tabernacle was a testimony that God had pardoned the Israelites' sins.

The Mishnah deduced from  that the Israelites in the wilderness inflicted ten trials on God, one of which was the incident of the spies. And the Mishnah deduced further from  that those who speak ill suffer more than those who commit physical acts, and thus that God sealed the judgment against the Israelites in the wilderness only because of their evil words at the incident of the spies.

Reading , a Midrash taught that in 18 verses, Scripture places Moses and Aaron (the instruments of Israel's deliverance) on an equal footing (reporting that God spoke to both of them alike), and thus there are 18 benedictions in the Amidah.

Expounding on the same word "congregation," Rabbi Halafta of Kefar Hanania deduced from the words "God stands in the congregation of God" in  that the Shechinah abides among ten who sit together and study Torah.

Similarly, the Gemara cited  to support the proposition that we need ten people in expressions of sanctity. The connotation of ten associated with the word “among” in the portion of Korah was, in turn, inferred by means of another verbal analogy between the word “congregation” written there and the word “congregation” written in reference to the ten spies who slandered the Land of Israel, as  says, “How long shall I bear with this evil congregation?” In the case of the spies, it was a congregation of ten people, as there were twelve spies altogether, and Joshua and Caleb were not included in the evil congregation. So, the Gemara reasoned, in the case of Korah, the reference must also be to a congregation of ten people.

Noting that in the incident of the spies, God did not punish those below the age of 20 (see ), whom  described as "children that . . . have no knowledge of good or evil," Rabbi Samuel bar Nahmani taught in Rabbi Jonathan's name that God does not punish for the actions people take in their first 20 years.

A Baraita taught that because of God's displeasure with the Israelites, the north wind did not blow on them in any of the 40 years during which they wandered in the wilderness. The Tosafot attributed God's displeasure to the incident of the spies, although Rashi attributed it to the Golden Calf.

Rabbi Akiva interpreted  to teach that the generation of the wilderness have no share in the World To Come and will not stand at the last judgment. Rabbi Eliezer said that it was concerning them that  said, "Gather my saints together to me; those who have made a covenant with me by sacrifice."

A Midrash noted that  says that in the incident of the spies, "the men ... when they returned, made all the congregation to murmur against him." The Midrash explained that that is why the report of  about the daughters of Zelophehad follows immediately after the report of  about the death of the wilderness generation. The Midrash noted that  says, "there was not left a man of them, save Caleb the son of Jephunneh," because the men had been unwilling to enter the Land. But the Midrash taught that  says, "then drew near the daughters of Zelophehad," to show that the women still sought an inheritance in the Land. The Midrash taught that in that generation, the women built up fences that the men broke down.

The Mishnah deduced from  that the spies have no portion in the World To Come, as the words "those men ... died" in  indicated that they died in this world, and the words "by the plague" indicated that they died in the World To Come.

Rabbah in the name of Resh Lakish deduced from  that the spies who brought an evil report against the land died by the plague, and died because of the evil report that they had brought.

Numbers chapter 15
And the Mishnah ruled that these meal-offerings required oil but not frankincense.

The Mishnah told that when Hillel the Elder observed that the nation withheld from lending to each other and were transgressing , "Beware lest there be in your mind a base thought," he instituted the prozbul, a court exemption from the Sabbatical year cancellation of a loan. The Mishnah taught that any loan made with a prozbul is not canceled by the Sabbatical year. The Mishnah recounted that a prozbul would provide: "I turn over to you, so-and-so, judges of such and such a place, that any debt that I may have outstanding, I shall collect it whenever I desire." And the judges or witnesses would sign below.

The Mishnah taught that five types of grain are subject to the law of challah: wheat, barley, spelt, oats, and rye. Quantities of dough made from these different grains are counted together. They were also subject to the prohibition of the consumption of new produce before the waiving of the first sheaf, and to the prohibition of reaping prior to Passover. If they took root prior to the waiving of the first sheaf, the waiving of the first sheaf released them for consumption. But if not, they were prohibited until the next waiving of the first sheaf. The Mishnah taught that rice, millet, poppy seed, sesame, and legumes are exempt from challah (for though they are sometimes made into dough, they are not capable of leavening), as are less than five-fourths of a kav, or about 3½ pounds (the minimum subject to challah) of the five kinds of grain subject to challah. Sponge-biscuits, honey cakes, dumplings, pancakes, and dough made from a mixture of consecrated and unconsecrated grain are also exempt from challah.

The Mishnah taught that the minimum measure of challah is one twenty-fourth part of the dough (or in the case if the minimum amount subject to challah, about 2¼ ounces). If one makes dough for oneself or for a wedding banquet, the minimum is still one twenty-fourth (and no distinction is made based on volume of dough intended for private consumption). If one makes dough to sell in the market, the minimum is one forty-eighth. If dough is rendered unclean either unwittingly or by force of unavoidable circumstances, it is one forty-eighth, but if it was rendered unclean deliberately, it is one twenty-fourth, so that one who sins shall not profit from sin. The Mishnah taught that one cannot designate all of one's dough as challah, but must leave some that is not challah.

The School of Rabbi Ishmael taught that whenever Scripture uses the word "command (tzav)" (as  does), it denotes exhortation to obedience immediately and for all time.

A Baraita taught that Rabbi Eliezer, the son of Rabbi Jose, said that he refuted the sectarian books that maintained that resurrection is not deducible from the Torah. To support the proposition that the Torah does refer to the resurrection of the dead, Rabbi Eliezer cited , which says, "Because he has despised the word of the Lord, and has broken his commandment, that soul shall utterly be cut off (hikareit tikareit); his iniquity shall be upon him." Rabbi Eliezer reasoned that as this person would be utterly be cut off in this world (meaning that he would die), the person's iniquity would need to be upon him in the next world (in the life after death). Rav Papa asked Abaye whether Rabbi Eliezer could not have deduced both this world and the next from the words "he shall be utterly cut off." The answer was that they would have replied that the Torah employed human phraseology. Similarly, the Tannaim disputed: Rabbi Akiva taught that the words, "That soul shall utterly be cut off (hikareit)," mean that he shall be cut off in this world and (tikareit) in the next. Rabbi Ishmael noted that  previously stated, "he reproaches the Lord, and that soul shall be cut off," and asked whether Rabbi Akiva's reasoning thus implied the existence of three words. Therefore,  says, "his iniquity is upon him," meaning that God decreed that the sinner shall be cut off only if the sinner's iniquity is still in him (and the sinner dies unrepentant).

Rabbi Ishmael taught that Scripture speaks in particular of idolatry, for  says, "Because he has despised the word of the Lord." You shall have no other gods before Me."

Rav Ḥisda taught that one walking in a dirty alleyway should not recite the Shema, and one reciting the Shema who comes upon a dirty alleyway should stop reciting. Of one who would not stop reciting, Rav Adda bar Ahavah quoted  to say: "he has despised the word of the Lord." And of one who does stop reciting, Rabbi Abbahu taught that  says: "through this word you shall prolong your days."

Rabbi Judah ben Bathyra answered Akiva that Akiva would have to give an account for his accusation. For either Akiva was right that Zelophehad was the man executed for gathering sticks on the Sabbath, and Akiva revealed something that the Torah shielded from public view, or Akiva was wrong that Zelophehad was the man executed for gathering sticks on the Sabbath, and Akiva cast a stigma upon a righteous man. But the Gemara answered that Akiva learned a tradition from the Oral Torah (that went back to Sinai, and thus the Torah did not shield the matter from public view). The Gemara then asked, according to Rabbi Judah ben Bathyra, of what sin did Zelophehad die (as his daughters reported in  that "he died in his own sin")?

But they did not know the correct form of death penalty for him, for God had not yet been specified what to do to him, as  says, "for it had not [yet] been specified what should be done to him." With regard to the blasphemer, the Sifra read , "until the decision of the Lord should be made clear to them," to indicate that they did not know whether or not the blasphemer was to be executed. (And if they placed the blasphemer together with the wood gatherer, it might have caused the blasphemer unnecessary fear, as he might have concluded that he was on death row. Therefore, they held the two separately.)

A Midrash asked to which commandment  refers when it says, "For if you shall diligently keep all this commandment that I command you, to do it, to love the Lord your God, to walk in all His ways, and to cleave to Him, then will the Lord drive out all these nations from before you, and you shall dispossess nations greater and mightier than yourselves." Rabbi Levi said that "this commandment" refers to the recitation of the Shema, but the Rabbis said that it refers to the Sabbath, which is equal to all the precepts of the Torah.

The Alphabet of Rabbi Akiva taught that when God was giving Israel the Torah, God told them that if they accepted the Torah and observed God's commandments, then God would give them for eternity a most precious thing that God possessed — the World To Come. When Israel asked to see in this world an example of the World To Come, God replied that the Sabbath is an example of the World To Come.

The Mishnah instructed that there is a section break in the Shema between reciting  and reciting  during which one may give and return greetings out of respect. And similarly, there is a section break between reciting  and reciting emet veyatziv. But Rabbi Judah said that one may not interrupt between reciting  and reciting emet veyatziv ("true and enduring . . .").

The Gemara asked why the Rabbis included  in the recitation of Shema, as it contains matter unrelated to the rest of the Shema. Rabbi Judah bar Ḥaviva taught that  includes five elements, including the primary reason for its inclusion, the Exodus from Egypt: The commandment of ritual fringes, mention of the Exodus from Egypt, the acceptance of the yoke of the commandments, admonition against the opinions of the heretics, admonition against thoughts of the transgressions of licentiousness, and admonition against thoughts of idolatry. The Gemara granted that  mentions three of these explicitly:  mentions the yoke of the commandments when it says: “And you shall look upon them and remember all the commandments of the Lord and you shall do them.”  mentions the ritual fringes when it says: “And they will make for themselves ritual fringes.” And  mentions the Exodus from Egypt when it says: “I am the Lord, your God, who took you out from the Land of Egypt.” But the Gemara asked where we derive the other elements mentioned above: Admonition against the opinions of the heretics, admonition against thoughts of transgressions of licentiousness, and admonition against thoughts of idolatry.

It was taught in a Baraita that Rabbi Meir used to ask why  specified blue from among all the colors for the fringes. Rabbi Meir taught that it was because blue resembles the color of the sea, and the sea resembles the color of the sky, and the sky resembles the color of the Throne of Glory, as  says, "And there was under His feet as it were a paved work of sapphire stone," and  says, "The likeness of a throne as the appearance of a sapphire stone." (And thus, when one sees the blue thread of the fringe, it will help call to mind God.) And it was taught in a Baraita that Rabbi Meir used to say that the punishment for failing to observe the white threads of the fringes is greater than for failing to observe the blue threads. The Gemara illustrated this by a parable: A king gave orders to two servants. He asked one servant to bring a seal of clay, and he asked other to bring a seal of gold. And they both failed in their tasks. The Gemara argued that the servant deserving the greater punishment was the one whom the king directed to bring a seal of clay. (For clay is easier to get than gold. Thus the punishment for failing to get the simple white fringe should be greater than the penalty for failing to get the rare blue thread.)

The Tosefta taught that for the blue color to be valid, it had to come from the particular shell that was used for that purpose.

The Mishnah taught that the absence of one of the four fringes required in  invalidates the others, as the four together form one precept. Rabbi Ishmael, however, said that the four are four separate precepts.

Noting that  says "a fringe" in the singular, the Sifri Zutta deduced that the obligation to wear fringes with a blue thread is a single religious obligation, not two.

In , the heart lusts. A Midrash catalogued the wide range of additional capabilities of the heart reported in the Hebrew Bible. The heart speaks, sees, hears, walks, falls, stands, rejoices, cries, is comforted, is troubled, becomes hardened, grows faint, grieves, fears, can be broken, becomes proud, rebels, invents, cavils, overflows, devises, desires, goes astray, is refreshed, can be stolen, is humbled, is enticed, errs, trembles, is awakened, loves, hates, envies, is searched, is rent, meditates, is like a fire, is like a stone, turns in repentance, becomes hot, dies, melts, takes in words, is susceptible to fear, gives thanks, covets, becomes hard, makes merry, acts deceitfully, speaks from out of itself, loves bribes, writes words, plans, receives commandments, acts with pride, makes arrangements, and aggrandizes itself.

The Jerusalem Talmud told that after hearing the law of tassels, Korah made some garments that were completely dyed blue, went to Moses, and asked Moses whether a garment that was already completely blue nonetheless had to have a blue corner tassel. When Moses answered that it did, Korah said that the Torah was not of Divine origin, Moses was not a prophet, and Aaron was not a high priest.

In medieval Jewish interpretation
The parashah is discussed in these medieval Jewish sources:

Numbers chapter 14
The Zohar found in God's Attributes as expressed in  components of God's essential Name. In the Zohar, Rabbi Simeon taught from the Book of Mystery that the Divine Name has both a revealed and a concealed form. In its revealed form, it is written as the four-letter Name of God, the Tetragrammaton, but in its undisclosed form it is written in other letters, and this undisclosed form represents the most Recondite of all. In the Zohar, Rabbi Judah taught that even the revealed form of the Name is hidden under other letters (as the name ADoNaY, is hidden within ADNY) in order to screen the most Recondite of all. They all combine in one composite Name. When people were more reverent, the priests openly enunciated the Name in the hearing of all, but after irreverence became widespread, the Name became concealed under other letters. At the time when the Name was disclosed, the priest would concentrate his mind on its deep and inner meaning, and he would utter the Name in such a way as to accord with that meaning. But when irreverence became common in the world, he would conceal all within the written letters. It is for this reason that  says simply "saying" (amor), instead of the imperative form "say" (imri), in a reference to the hidden letters within the words of the Priestly Blessing. The word , amor has in its letters the numerical value of 248 minus one ( equals 1;  equals 40;  equals 6;  equals 200; and 1 + 40 + 6 + 200 = 247), equal to the number of a man's bodily parts, excepting the one part on which all the rest depend.

Maimonides taught that the Sages said that inspiration does not come to a prophet when the prophet is sad or languid. Thus Moses did not receive any revelation when he was in a state of depression that lasted from the murmurings of the Israelites upon the evil report of the spies until the death of the warriors of that generation.

Numbers chapter 15
But Maimonides credited another person with suggesting the reason that meat is the best nourishment for the appetite, the source of which is the liver; wine supports best the vital faculty, whose center is the heart; and music is most agreeable to the psychic faculty, the source of which is the brain. Thus, Maimonides wrote, each of a person's faculties approached God with that which it liked best. And thus the sacrifice consisted of meat, wine, and music.

Anyone who separates challah — both in the Land of Israel and in the Diaspora — should recite the blessing: "Blessed are You . . . Who sanctified us with His commandments and commanded us to separate challah." And Maimonides taught that it is permitted to eat first and then separate the challah in the Diaspora, for the fundamental obligation is Rabbinic in origin.

Maimonides wrote that converts may say such declarations in the prescribed order and not change them in the least, and may bless and pray in the same way as every Jew by birth. Maimonides reasoned that Abraham taught the people, brought many under the wings of the Divine Presence, and ordered members of his household after him to keep God's ways forever. Ever since then, Maimonides taught, whoever adopts Judaism is counted among the disciples of Abraham. They are Abraham's household, and Abraham converted them to righteousness. In the same way that Abraham converted his contemporaries, he converts future generations through the testament that he left behind him. Thus Abraham is the father of his posterity who keep his ways and of all proselytes who adopt Judaism. Therefore, Maimonides counseled converts to pray, "God of our fathers," because Abraham is their father. Maimonides concluded that there is no difference between converts and born Jews. Both should say the blessing, "Who has chosen us," "Who has given us," "Who have taken us for Your own," and "Who has separated us"; for God has chosen converts and separated them from the nations and given them the Torah. For the Torah has been given to born Jews and proselytes alike, as  says, "One ordinance shall be both for you of the congregation, and also for the stranger that sojourns with you, an ordinance forever in your generations; as you are, so shall the stranger be before the Lord." Maimonides counseled converts not to consider their origin as inferior. While born Jews descend from Abraham, Isaac, and Jacob, converts derive from God, through whose word the world was created. As Isaiah said in  "One shall say, I am the Lord's, and another shall call himself by the name of Jacob."

Maimonides noted that in nature, God created animals that develop gradually. For example, when a mammal is born, it is extremely tender, and cannot eat dry food, so God provided breasts that yield milk to feed the young animal, until it can eat dry food. Similarly, Maimonides taught, God instituted many laws as temporary measures, as it would have been impossible for the Israelites suddenly to discontinue everything to which they had become accustomed. So God sent Moses to make the Israelites (in the words of ) "a kingdom of priests and a holy nation." But the general custom of worship in those days was sacrificing animals in temples that contained idols. So God did not command the Israelites to give up those manners of service, but allowed them to continue. God transferred to God's service what had formerly served as a worship of idols, and commanded the Israelites to serve God in the same manner — namely, to build to a Sanctuary, to erect the altar to God's name, to offer sacrifices to God, to bow down to God, and to burn incense before God. By this Divine plan, God blotted out the traces of idolatry, and established the great principle of the Existence and Unity of God. But the sacrificial service, Maimonides taught, was not the primary object of God's commandments about sacrifice; rather, supplications, prayers, and similar kinds of worship are nearer to the primary object. Thus God limited sacrifice to only one temple (see ) and the priesthood to only the members of a particular family. These restrictions, Maimonides taught, served to limit sacrificial worship, and kept it within such bounds that God did not feel it necessary to abolish sacrificial service altogether. But in the Divine plan, prayer and supplication can be offered everywhere and by every person, as can be the wearing of tzitzit and tefillin (16) and similar kinds of service.

Yehuda Halevi taught that one wears the fringes lest one be entrapped by worldly thoughts, as  says, "That you may not go astray after your heart and after your eyes."

Maimonides taught that the tassel on the fringes of a garment is called tzitzit, because it resembles the locks of hair on one's head, as  says, "And he took me by the locks (be-tzitzit) of my head." The Torah does not set a fixed number of strands for the tassel. They take a strand of wool, called techelet, that is dyed sky-blue and wind it around the tassel. The Torah does not set a fixed number of times that this strand should be wound around the tassel. , which states, "And you shall make tassels . . . and you shall place on the tassels of the corner a strand of techelet," contains two commandments: (1) to make a tassel on the fringe of a four-cornered garment, and (2) to wind a strand of techelet around the tassel. The absence of techelet, however, does not prevent one from fulfilling the commandment with white strands, as a person who does not have techelet should make tzitzit from white strands alone. Whether the tzitzit a person wears on a garment are white, techelet, or a combination of the two, it is a single commandment, as  states, "And they shall be tzitzit for you." The presence of four tzitzit is necessary for the commandment to be fulfilled. Maimonides taught that tzitzit must be made by a Jew, as  says: "Speak to the children of Israel . . . and you shall make tzitzit for yourselves."

Maimonides taught that techelet refers to wool dyed light blue, the color of the sky opposite the sun on a clear day. The term refers to a specific dye, and use of any other dye is unfit even though it is sky-blue in color. The techelet of tzitzit is dyed by soaking wool in lime. Afterwards, it is taken and washed until it is clean and then boiled with bleach to prepare it to accept the dye. They take the blood of a chilazon fish, found in the Mediterranean Sea, whose color is like the color of the sea and whose blood is black like ink, and place the blood in a pot together with herbs, boil it, and insert the wool until it becomes sky-blue. Maimonides taught that one may buy techelet from an outlet that has established a reputation for authenticity without question, and one may rely on its reputation until a reason for suspicion arises. When a garment is entirely red, green, or any other color other than white, its white strands should be made from the same color as the garment itself. If the garment is techelet, its white strands should be made from any color other than black.

Maimonides taught that a garment to which the Torah obligates a person to attach tzitzit must have three characteristics: (1) it must have four or more corners; (2) it must be large enough to cover both the head and most of the body of a child who is able to walk on his own in the marketplace without having someone watch him; and (3) it must be made of either wool or linen. For a garment of wool, the white strands should be made of wool. For a garment of linen, the white strands should be made of linen. For garments of other fabrics, the white strands should be made from the same fabric as the garment. , which says, "And you shall see them," implies that the obligation to wear tzitzit applies during the day, but not at night. Nevertheless, a blind man is obligated to wear tzitzit, for even though he does not see them, others see him wearing them. One is permitted to wear tzitzit at night, provided he does not recite a blessing. One should recite the blessing over tzitzit in the morning when the sun has risen so that one can tell the strands of techelet from those that are white. The blessing is: "Blessed are you, God, our Lord, King of the universe, who has sanctified us with His commandments and commanded us to wrap ourselves with tzitzit." One should recite the blessing anytime he wraps himself in tzitzit during the day. Maimonides taught that the Torah does not require women and children to wear tzitzit, but the Rabbis oblige every boy who knows how to dress himself to wear tzitzit so as to teach him to fulfill commandments. Women who wish to wrap themselves in tzitzit may do so without reciting a blessing, and no one should prevent them. Maimonides taught that there is no obligation to attach tzitzit to a garment that remains folded in place, without a person wearing it. The garment does not require tzitzit. Rather, the person wearing the garment has the obligation. Maimonides taught that even though a person is not obligated to buy a tallit and wrap himself in it so that he must attach tzitzit to it, it is not proper for a person to release himself from the commandment. He should always try to be wrapped in a garment that requires tzitzit so as to fulfill the commandment. In particular, Maimonides taught that one should take care to be wrapped in a tallit during prayer, and it is very shameful for a Torah scholar to pray without being wrapped in a tallit. And Maimonides taught that a person should always be careful regarding the commandment of tzitzit, because , which says "And you shall see them and remember all the commandments of God," implies that the commandment of tzitzit is considered equal to all the commandments and all the commandments are considered dependent on it.

Citing , Baḥya ibn Paquda taught that not to seek after your own heart is a leading example of a negative duty of the heart. Baḥya also cited  for the proposition that a tainted motive renders even numerous good deeds unacceptable.

The Sefer ha-Chinuch cited  for the commandment not to wander after the thoughts of the heart and the vision of the eyes. The Sefer ha-Chinuch interpreted this negative commandment to prevent one from dedicating one's thoughts to opinions that are antithetical to those on which the Torah is built, as that may lead one to apostasy. Rather, if the spirit to pursue these bad opinions should arise, one should minimize one's thinking about them, and redouble one's efforts to contemplate the ways of the Torah. Similarly, one should not pursue the things one sees, including the desires of this world. The Sefer ha-Chinuch taught this commandment is a fundamental principle in Judaism, as evil thoughts are the progenitors of impurities, and actions follow them. The Sefer ha-Chinuch taught that the more one allows oneself to be governed by one's desires and allows them to become habit, the stronger one's evil inclination becomes. But if one conquers one's evil inclination and closes one's eyes from seeing evil one time, it will be easier to do so many times. The Sefer ha-Chinuch taught that this commandment is practiced in all places and at all times by both men and women. But the Sefer ha-Chinuch taught that they did not administer lashes for this negative commandment, because there is no specific thing for which the transgressor can be warned, as people are made in such a way that it is impossible for their eyes not to sometimes see more than what is fitting, and it is similarly impossible for human thought not to sometimes go beyond what is fitting, so it is impossible to limit people with clear boundaries.

In modern interpretation
The parashah is discussed in these modern sources:

Numbers chapter 13
The 17th century Torah commentator Rabbi Shlomo Luntschitz, also known as the Kli Yakar, reported a Midrash that taught that God told Moses that with God's knowledge of the future, God knew that it would be better to send women who cherish the Land because they would not count its faults. But, God told Moses (in the words of ), "for you (lecha)," with the knowledge Moses had, if he thought that these men were fit and the Land was dear to them, then Moses could send men. Therefore, God told Moses (once again, in the words of ), "send for yourselves (shelach-lecha)," according to the level of knowledge that Moses had, men. But according to God's level of knowledge, it would have been better, God said, to send women.

MacDonald wrote that the term for milk (chalav) could easily be the word for "fat" (chelev), and the word for honey (devash) could indicate not bees' honey but a sweet syrup made from fruit. The expression evoked a general sense of the bounty of the land and suggested an ecological richness exhibited in a number of ways, not just with milk and honey. MacDonald noted that the expression was always used to describe a land that the people of Israel had not yet experienced, and thus characterized it as always a future expectation.

Numbers chapter 15
From this act of twisting a piece of dough comes the custom of braiding the Sabbath loaf as a reminder that challah was taken, and hence, also, comes the name "challah" for the Sabbath loaf.

In 1950, the Committee on Jewish Law and Standards of Conservative Judaism ruled: “Refraining from the use of a motor vehicle is an important aid in the maintenance of the Sabbath spirit of repose. Such restraint aids, moreover, in keeping the members of the family together on the Sabbath. However where a family resides beyond reasonable walking distance from the synagogue, the use of a motor vehicle for the purpose of synagogue attendance shall in no wise be construed as a violation of the Sabbath but, on the contrary, such attendance shall be deemed an expression of loyalty to our faith. . . . [I]n the spirit of a living and developing Halachah responsive to the changing needs of our people, we declare it to be permitted to use electric lights on the Sabbath for the purpose of enhancing the enjoyment of the Sabbath, or reducing personal discomfort in the performance of a mitzvah.”

The 20th century Reform Rabbi Gunther Plaut argued that  includes the words "throughout your settlements" to make clear that the injunction not to kindle fire on the Sabbath applied not only during the building of the Tabernacle, to which the prohibition primarily related.

Bamberger reported that the inability of Moses to handle these cases on his own troubled the Rabbis.

Baruch Spinoza wrote that because religion only acquires the force of law by means of the sovereign power, Moses was not able to punish those who, before the covenant, and consequently while still in possession of their rights, violated the Sabbath (in ), but Moses was able to do so after the covenant (in ), because all the Israelites had then yielded up their natural rights, and the ordinance of the Sabbath had received the force of law.

Professor Robert Alter of the University of California, Berkeley, translated  to call for "an indigo twist" on the Israelites’ garments. Alter explained that the dye was not derived from a plant, as is indigo, but from a substance secreted by the murex, harvested off the coast of Phoenicia. The extraction and preparation of this dye were labor-intensive and thus quite costly. It was used for royal garments in many places in the Mediterranean region, and in Israel it was also used for priestly garments and for the cloth furnishings of the Tabernacle. Alter argued that the indigo twist betokened the idea that Israel should become (in the words of ) a "kingdom of priests and a holy nation" and perhaps also that, as the covenanted people, metaphorically God's firstborn, the nation as a whole had royal status. Fox argued that the tzitzit on the Israelites’ garments identified them as being holy to God and symbolically connected them to the priests. Thereby, the Israelites pledged their loyalty to God as well as to the priests who oversaw the laws. And similarly, Terence Fretheim, Professor Emeritus at Luther Seminary, argued that tassels, worn by royalty in the ancient Near East, were to be attached to each corner of everyone's garments, with a blue(-purple) cord on each, as a public sign of Israel's status as a holy people and a reminder of what that entailed.

Forcing people to put a special blue tassel on their clothes, ancient interpreters suggested Korah must have argued, was an intolerable intrusion into their lives. Korah asked why, if someone's whole garment was already dyed blue, that person needed to add an extra blue thread to the corner tassel. But this question, ancient interpreters implied, was really a metaphorical version of Korah's complaint in  "Everyone in the congregation [of Levites] is holy, and the Lord is in their midst. So why then do you exalt yourselves above the assembly of the Lord?" In other words, Korah asserted that all Levites were part of the same garment and all blue, and asked why Moses and Aaron thought that they were special just because they were the corner thread. In saying this, Kugel argued, Korah set a pattern for would-be revolutionaries thereafter to seek to bring down the ruling powers with the taunt: "What makes you better than the rest of us?" Kugel wrote that ancient interpreters thus taught that Korah was not really interested in changing the system, but merely in taking it over. Korah was thus a dangerous demagogue.

Commandments
According to Maimonides and the Sefer ha-Chinuch, there are 2 positive and 1 negative commandments in the parashah.

To set aside a portion of dough for a Kohen
To have tzitzit on four-cornered garments
Not to stray after the whims of one's heart or temptations one sees with his eyes

In the liturgy
Numbers 14:19–20 are recited immediately following the Kol Nidre prayer on Yom Kippur. The leader recites verse 19, then the leader and congregation recite verse 20 three times.

 is the third of three blocks of verses in the Shema, a central prayer in Jewish prayer services.

Reuven Hammer noted that Mishnah Tamid 5:1 recorded what was in effect the first siddur, as a part of which priests daily recited .

The Weekly Maqam
In the Weekly Maqam, Sephardi Jews each week base the songs of the services on the content of that week's parashah. For parashah Shlach, Sephardi Jews apply Maqam Hijaz, the maqam that expresses mourning and sadness, which is appropriate because the parashah contains the episode of the spies and the punishment of Israel.

Haftarah

Summary of the haftarah
Joshua secretly dispatched two spies from Shittim, instructing them to view the land and Jericho, and they went to the house of a harlot named Rahab. That night, the king of Jericho received word that Israelite men had come to search out the land, and the king sent a demand to Rahab to deliver the men who had come to her house. But Rahab hid the men among stalks of flax on her roof, saying that when it was dark the men had left, and she did not know where they went. The king's men left the city in pursuit of the spies on the road to the Jordan River, and the people of the city shut the city gate after them.

Rahab promptly went up to the spies on the roof and told them that she knew that God had given the Israelites the land, and that the people lived in terror of the Israelites, having heard how God dried up the Red Sea before them and how the Israelites had destroyed the forces of Sihon and Og. So Rahab asked the spies to swear by God, since she had dealt kindly with them, that they would also deal kindly with her father's house and give her a token to save her family from the coming invasion. The spies told her that if she would not tell of their doings, then when God gave the Israelites the land, they would deal kindly with her. She let them down by a cord through her window, as her house was on the city wall. She told them to hide in the mountain for three days. They told her that when the Israelites came to the land, she was to bind in her window the scarlet rope by which she let the spies down and gather her family into her house for safety, as all who ventured out of the doors of her house would die. She agreed, sent them on their way, and bound the scarlet line in her window.

The spies hid in the mountain for three days, and the pursuers did not find them. The spies returned to the Israelite camp and told Joshua all that had happened, saying that surely God had delivered the land into their hands and the inhabitants would melt away before them.

Connection between the haftarah and the parashah
Both the parashah and the haftarah deal with spies sent to scout out the land of Israel, the parashah in connection with the ten scouts sent to reconnoiter the whole land, and the haftarah in connection with the two spies sent to reconnoiter Jericho. Joshua participated in both ventures, as a scout in the parashah, and as the leader who sent the spies in the haftarah. In the parashah, God complained about how the Israelites did not believe the "signs" (otot) that God had sent, and in the haftarah, Rahab asked the spies for a true "sign" (ot) so that she might believe them.

Whereas in the parashah, the spies were well-known men, in the haftarah, Joshua dispatched the spies secretly. Whereas in the parashah, Moses sent a large number of 12 spies, in the haftarah, Joshua sent just 2 spies. Whereas in the parashah, many of the spies cowered before the Canaanites, in the haftarah, the spies reported that the Canaanites would melt before the Israelites. Whereas in the parashah, the spies reported their findings publicly, in the haftarah, the spies reported directly to Joshua.

The haftarah in classical Rabbinic interpretation
A Midrash taught that no other people sent to perform a religious duty and risk their lives on a mission could compare with the two spies whom Joshua sent. The Rabbis taught that the two were Phinehas and Caleb. The Midrash noted that  says, "Joshua the son of Nun sent out of Shittim two spies secretly" (cheresh). Whoever wishes, let him come and buy!" so that no one might detect them or say that they were spies.

The Rabbis taught that Rahab was one of the four most beautiful women who ever lived, along with Sarah, Abigail, and Esther. The Rabbis taught that Rahab inspired lust by the mere mention of her name. Rabbi Isaac taught that saying Rahab's name twice would cause a man immediately to lose control. Rav Nachman protested that he said Rahab's name twice and nothing happened to him. Rabbi Isaac replied that he meant that this would happen to any man who knew her.

A Midrash explained that  speaks of Rahab's hiding "him" instead of "them" because Phinehas, as a prophet, had the power to make himself invisible.

A Midrash taught that for hiding the spies, God rewarded the convert Rahab with priestly descendants.

Reading , a Midrash noted that Rahab, like Israel, Jethro, and the Queen of Sheba, came to the Lord after hearing of God's miracles.

Rabbi Eleazar recounted that Rahab knew in  that the Canaanites had lost heart because they had lost their virility.

The Mekhilta of Rabbi Ishmael taught that as the events of  took place, Rahab converted to Judaism, at the end of her fiftieth year. She said before God that she had sinned in three ways. And she asked to be forgiven on account of three things — on account of the red cord, the window, and the wall.

A Midrash deduced from  that Rahab received a prophetic vision of what the spies' pursuers would do.

Notes

Further reading
The parashah has parallels or is discussed in these sources:

Biblical
 (Nephilim).
 (God lifted up God's hand);  (pillar of fire);  (pillar of fire);  (20:5 in JPS) (punishing children for fathers' sin);  (punishing children for fathers' sin).
 (inquiry of God on the law).
 (inquiry of God on the law); 27:1–11 (inquiry of God on the law).
 (the scouts);  (5:9 in JPS) (punishing children for fathers' sin);  (rebellion).
. (Rahab and her descendants).

 (keeping the Sabbath);  (universally observed Sabbath).
 (31:29–30 in NJPS) (not punishing children for fathers' sin).
 (not punishing children for fathers' sin);  (God lifted up God's hand).
 (pillar of fire);  (God lifted up God's hand); . ("slow to anger");  (pillar of fire).

Early nonrabbinic
Philo. Allegorical Interpretation 3:61:175; On the Birth of Abel and the Sacrifices Offered by Him and by His Brother Cain 33:107; On the Posterity of Cain and His Exile 17:60; 35:122; On the Giants 11:48; On the Migration of Abraham 12:68; 21:122; On the Change of Names 21:123; 46:265; On Dreams, That They Are God-Sent 2:25:170; On the Virtues 32:171; Questions and Answers on Genesis 1:100. Alexandria, Egypt, early 1st Century C.E. In, e.g., The Works of Philo: Complete and Unabridged, New Updated Edition. Translated by Charles Duke Yonge, pages 70, 107, 137, 144, 155, 259, 265, 351, 360, 364, 400, 657, 813. Peabody, Massachusetts: Hendrickson Publishers, 1993.
Pseudo-Philo 15:1–7; 57:2. 1st Century C.E. In, e.g., The Old Testament Pseudepigrapha, Edited by James H. Charlesworth, volume 2, pages 322–23, 371. New York: Doubleday, 1985.
 Circa 80–90 C.E. (Rahab).
Josephus, Antiquities of the Jews 1:8:3 ; 3:14:1 –15:3 ; 4:1:1–3 . Circa 93–94 C.E. In, e.g., The Works of Josephus: Complete and Unabridged, New Updated Edition. Translated by William Whiston, pages 39, 99–102. Peabody, Massachusetts: Hendrickson Publishers, 1987.

Classical rabbinic
Mishnah: Berakhot 2:2; Challah 1:1–4:11; Shabbat 1:1–24:5; Sanhedrin 1:6; 10:3; Eduyot 1:2; Avot 3:6; 5:4; Horayot 1:4; 2:6; Zevachim 4:3; 12:5; Menachot 3:5; 4:1; 5:3; 9:1; Arakhin 3:5; Keritot 1:1–2; Tamid 5:1. Land of Israel, circa 200 C.E. In, e.g., The Mishnah: A New Translation. Translated by Jacob Neusner, pages 5, 147–58, 179–208, 585, 605, 640, 679, 685, 691, 694, 705, 726, 739–40, 742, 751, 813, 836–37, 869. New Haven: Yale University Press, 1988.
Tosefta: Challah 1:1–2:12; Shabbat 1:1–17:29; Sotah 4:13–14; 7:18; 9:2; Sanhedrin 13:9–10; Eduyot 1:1; Horayot 1:4; Bekhorot 3:12; Arakhin 2:11. Land of Israel, circa 300 C.E. In, e.g., The Tosefta: Translated from the Hebrew, with a New Introduction. Translated by Jacob Neusner, volume 1, pages 331–40, 357–427, 848–49, 865, 873; volume 2, pages 1190–91, 1245, 1296, 1479, 1500. Peabody, Massachusetts: Hendrickson Publishers, 2002.
Sifre to Numbers 107:1–115:5. Land of Israel, circa 250–350 C.E. In, e.g., Sifré to Numbers: An American Translation and Explanation. Translated by Jacob Neusner, volume 2, pages 133–84. Atlanta: Scholars Press, 1986.
Sifra 34:4; 242:1:12. Land of Israel, 4th Century C.E. In, e.g., Sifra: An Analytical Translation. Translated by Jacob Neusner, volume 1, page 214; volume 3, pages 283–84. Atlanta: Scholars Press, 1988.
Jerusalem Talmud: Demai 1a–77b; Terumot 1a–107a; Maaser Sheni 4a, 5a, 53b–54a; Challah 9b, 23b, 29a, 33a; Orlah 18a, 20a; Bikkurim 1a–26b; Pesachim 42b, 58a; Yoma 11a; Yevamot 51b–52a, 65b, 73b–74a; Ketubot 36a; Gittin 27b; Sanhedrin 11a, 60b, 62b, 68a–b. Tiberias, Land of Israel, circa 400 CE. In, e.g., Talmud Yerushalmi. Edited by Chaim Malinowitz, Yisroel Simcha Schorr, and Mordechai Marcus, volumes 4, 7–8, 10–12, 18–19, 21, 30–31, 39, 44–45. Brooklyn: Mesorah Publications, 2006–2018. And reprinted in, e.g., The Jerusalem Talmud: A Translation and Commentary. Edited by Jacob Neusner and translated by Jacob Neusner, Tzvee Zahavy, B. Barry Levy, and Edward Goldman. Peabody, Massachusetts: Hendrickson Publishers, 2009.
Mekhilta of Rabbi Ishmael Pisha 1, 5; Beshallah 1–2; Vayassa 3; Amalek 1–3; Bahodesh 9. Land of Israel, late 4th Century. In, e.g., Mekhilta de-Rabbi Ishmael. Translated by Jacob Z. Lauterbach, volume 1, pages 2–3, 26, 117–18, 124, 129, 237; volume 2, pages 255, 266–67, 273, 341. Philadelphia: Jewish Publication Society, 1933, reissued 2004.
Sifri Zutta Shelah. Land of Israel, late 4th century CE. In, e.g., Sifré Zutta to Numbers. Translated by Jacob Neusner, pages 135–60. Lanham, Maryland: University Press of America, 2009.
Genesis Rabbah 1:4; 11:2; 14:1; 17:8; 43:9; 47:1; 58:4; 85:9; 91:3; 97 (NV). Land of Israel, 5th century. In, e.g., Midrash Rabbah: Genesis. Translated by Harry Freedman and Maurice Simon, volume 1, pages 6–7, 80, 111, 138–39, 358–59, 399; volume 2, pages 510–11, 795, 833–34, 896–99, 903. London: Soncino Press, 1939.
Mekhilta de-Rabbi Shimon 12:3; 20:1, 5; 37:1; 44:1; 45:1; 54:2. Land of Israel, 5th Century. In, e.g., Mekhilta de-Rabbi Shimon bar Yohai. Translated by W. David Nelson, pages 40, 81, 85, 160, 184, 193, 248. Philadelphia: Jewish Publication Society, 2006.

Babylonian Talmud: Berakhot 11b, 12b, 24a–b, 32a; Shabbat 9b, 15a, 20b, 22a, 23b, 27b, 32a–b, 68b, 89a–b, 96b, 132a, 137a, 153b; Eruvin 83a, 92b; Pesachim 6a, 37a, 38a, 50b, 77a, 93b, 101a, 119b; Yoma 7a, 10a, 15b, 26b, 36b, 44a, 57a, 61b; Sukkah 9a, 35a–b, 41b–42a; Beitzah 12b, 21a; Taanit 22a, 24a, 29a; Megillah 7b, 31b; Moed Katan 9a, 19a; Chagigah 5b, 9b, 14b; Yevamot 4b, 5b, 9a, 46b, 72a, 90b; Ketubot 6b, 16b, 25a, 72a, 111b–12a; Nedarim 12a, 20b, 25a; Nazir 58a; Sotah 11b, 17a, 22a, 30a, 32b, 34a–35a, 46b; Gittin 46a, 61a; Kiddushin 29a, 33b, 37a–b, 46b, 53a, 73a; Bava Kamma 2a, 13a, 71a, 92b, 94a, 110b, 114b, 119b; Bava Metzia 61b; Bava Batra 4a, 15a, 73b–74a, 117b, 118b–19a, 121a–b; Sanhedrin 6b, 8a, 12a, 19b, 41a, 43a, 61b, 64b, 78b, 88b, 90b, 99a–b, 104b, 107a, 108a, 109b–10b, 111b, 112b; Makkot 13b, 17b, 18b, 23b; Shevuot 7b, 10a, 11b, 13a, 22a, 26b, 29a, 39a; Horayot 2a, 3b, 4b–5b, 7a–9a, 13a; Zevachim 8b, 18b, 39b, 41a, 45a, 47a, 78a, 90b, 91b, 111a; Menachot 5b–6a, 9b, 12b, 14a, 15b, 18b, 20a, 27a, 28a, 38a, 39b, 40b, 41b–43a, 44a–45a, 51a, 53b, 59a, 66a, 67a, 70b, 73b–74a, 77b, 79a, 90b–92a, 104a, 107a, 109a; Chullin 2b, 14a, 23a, 89a, 95b, 104a, 135b–36a; Bekhorot 12b, 30b; Arakhin 11b, 15a; Temurah 3a; Keritot 2a, 3a–b, 7b, 8b–9a, 25b; Meilah 10b, 15b; Niddah 47a. Babylonia, 6th Century. In, e.g., Talmud Bavli. Edited by Yisroel Simcha Schorr, Chaim Malinowitz, and Mordechai Marcus, 72 volumes. Brooklyn: Mesorah Pubs., 2006.

Medieval

Avot of Rabbi Natan, 9:2; 20:6; 34:1; 36:4, 7. Circa 700–900 C.E. In, e.g., The Fathers According to Rabbi Nathan. Translated by Judah Goldin, pages 54, 96–97, 136, 149, 152. New Haven: Yale University Press, 1955.
Solomon ibn Gabirol. A Crown for the King, 27:334–35. Spain, 11th Century. Translated by David R. Slavitt, 44–45. New York: Oxford University Press, 1998.
Rashi. Commentary. Numbers 13–15. Troyes, France, late 11th Century. In, e.g., Rashi. The Torah: With Rashi's Commentary Translated, Annotated, and Elucidated. Translated and annotated by Yisrael Isser Zvi Herczeg, volume 4, pages 147–88. Brooklyn: Mesorah Publications, 1997.
Rashbam. Commentary on the Torah. Troyes, early 12th century. In, e.g., Rashbam's Commentary on Leviticus and Numbers: An Annotated Translation. Edited and translated by Martin I. Lockshin, pages 205–24. Providence: Brown Judaic Studies, 2001.
Judah Halevi. Kuzari. 2:50; 3:11, 38. Toledo, Spain, 1130–1140. In, e.g., Jehuda Halevi. Kuzari: An Argument for the Faith of Israel. Introduction by Henry Slonimsky, pages 115, 147, 169. New York: Schocken, 1964.
Numbers Rabbah 1:11; 2:19; 3:7; 4:14, 20; 7:4; 8:6; 9:18; 10:2; 13:15–16; 14:1, 3–4; 15:24; 16:1–17:6; 18:3, 6, 21; 19:20–21; 20:23; 21:10. 12th Century. In, e.g., Midrash Rabbah: Numbers. Translated by Judah J. Slotki, volume 5, pages 18, 57, 79, 112, 130, 183, 229, 275, 339, 344; volume 6, pages 534, 564, 566, 573, 584, 670, 673–707, 709, 715, 735, 738, 769–70, 820, 836. London: Soncino Press, 1939.
Abraham ibn Ezra. Commentary on the Torah. Mid-12th century. In, e.g., Ibn Ezra's Commentary on the Pentateuch: Numbers (Ba-Midbar). Translated and annotated by H. Norman Strickman and Arthur M. Silver, pages 101–25. New York: Menorah Publishing Company, 1999.
Benjamin of Tudela. The Itinerary of Benjamin of Tudela. Spain, 1173. In The Itinerary of Benjamin of Tudela: Travels in the Middle Ages. Introductions by Michael A. Singer, Marcus Nathan Adler, A. Asher, page 91. Malibu, California: Joseph Simon, 1983. (giants).

Maimonides. Mishneh Torah: Hilchot Tzitzit (The Laws of Tzitzit). Egypt. Circa 1170–1180. In, e.g., Mishneh Torah: Hilchot Tefillin UMezuzah V'Sefer Torah: The Laws (Governing) Tefillin, Mezuzah, and Torah Scrolls: and Hilchot Tzitzit: The Laws of Tzitzit. Translated by Eliyahu Touger, volume 7, pages 192–235. New York: Moznaim Publishing, 1990.
Maimonides. The Guide for the Perplexed, part 1, chapters 30, 39, 65; part 2, chapter 36; part 3, chapters 29, 32, 34, 39, 41, 46. Cairo, Egypt, 1190. In, e.g., Moses Maimonides. The Guide for the Perplexed. Translated by Michael Friedländer, pages 39–40, 54, 97, 320, 325, 329, 339, 348, 363, 366. New York: Dover Publications, 1956.
Hezekiah ben Manoah. Hizkuni. France, circa 1240. In, e.g., Chizkiyahu ben Manoach. Chizkuni: Torah Commentary. Translated and annotated by Eliyahu Munk, volume 4, pages 915–32. Jerusalem: Ktav Publishers, 2013.

Nachmanides. Commentary on the Torah. Jerusalem, circa 1270. In, e.g., Ramban (Nachmanides): Commentary on the Torah: Numbers. Translated by Charles B. Chavel, volume 4, pages 118–57. New York: Shilo Publishing House, 1975.
Zohar 3:156b–176a. Spain, late 13th Century. In, e.g., The Zohar. Translated by Harry Sperling and Maurice Simon. 5 volumes. London: Soncino Press, 1934.
Jacob ben Asher (Baal Ha-Turim). Rimze Ba'al ha-Turim. Early 14th century. In, e.g., Baal Haturim Chumash: Bamidbar/Numbers. Translated by Eliyahu Touger; edited and annotated by Avie Gold, volume 4, pages 1507–45. Brooklyn: Mesorah Publications, 2003.
Jacob ben Asher. Perush Al ha-Torah. Early 14th century. In, e.g., Yaakov ben Asher. Tur on the Torah. Translated and annotated by Eliyahu Munk, volume 3, pages 1079–100. Jerusalem: Lambda Publishers, 2005.
Isaac ben Moses Arama. Akedat Yizhak (The Binding of Isaac). Late 15th century. In, e.g., Yitzchak Arama. Akeydat Yitzchak: Commentary of Rabbi Yitzchak Arama on the Torah. Translated and condensed by Eliyahu Munk, volume 2, pages 713–28. New York, Lambda Publishers, 2001.

Modern
Isaac Abravanel. Commentary on the Torah. Italy, between 1492–1509. In, e.g., Abarbanel: Selected Commentaries on the Torah: Volume 4: Bamidbar/Numbers. Translated and annotated by Israel Lazar, pages 116–59. Brooklyn: CreateSpace, 2015. And excerpted in, e.g., Abarbanel on the Torah: Selected Themes. Translated by Avner Tomaschoff, pages 382–94. Jerusalem: Jewish Agency for Israel, 2007.
Obadiah ben Jacob Sforno. Commentary on the Torah. Venice, 1567. In, e.g., Sforno: Commentary on the Torah. Translation and explanatory notes by Raphael Pelcovitz, pages 708–29. Brooklyn: Mesorah Publications, 1997.
Moshe Alshich. Commentary on the Torah. Safed, circa 1593. In, e.g., Moshe Alshich. Midrash of Rabbi Moshe Alshich on the Torah. Translated and annotated by Eliyahu Munk, volume 3, pages 842–64. New York, Lambda Publishers, 2000.

Avraham Yehoshua Heschel. Commentaries on the Torah. Cracow, Poland, mid 17th century. Compiled as Chanukat HaTorah. Edited by Chanoch Henoch Erzohn. Piotrkow, Poland, 1900. In Avraham Yehoshua Heschel. Chanukas HaTorah: Mystical Insights of Rav Avraham Yehoshua Heschel on Chumash. Translated by Avraham Peretz Friedman, pages 255–59. Southfield, Michigan: Targum Press/Feldheim Publishers, 2004.
Thomas Hobbes. Leviathan, 3:36. England, 1651. Reprint edited by C. B. Macpherson, page 464. Harmondsworth, England: Penguin Classics, 1982.
Shabbethai Bass. Sifsei Chachamim. Amsterdam, 1680. In, e.g., Sefer Bamidbar: From the Five Books of the Torah: Chumash: Targum Okelos: Rashi: Sifsei Chachamim: Yalkut: Haftaros, translated by Avrohom Y. Davis, pages 207–69. Lakewood Township, New Jersey: Metsudah Publications, 2013.

Chaim ibn Attar. Ohr ha-Chaim. Venice, 1742. In Chayim ben Attar. Or Hachayim: Commentary on the Torah. Translated by Eliyahu Munk, volume 4, pages 1442–96. Brooklyn: Lambda Publishers, 1999.
Samson Raphael Hirsch. Horeb: A Philosophy of Jewish Laws and Observances. Translated by Isidore Grunfeld, pages 9–12, 180–86, 196–203. London: Soncino Press, 1962. Reprinted 2002. Originally published as Horeb, Versuche über Jissroel's Pflichten in der Zerstreuung. Germany, 1837.

Samuel David Luzzatto (Shadal). Commentary on the Torah. Padua, 1871. In, e.g., Samuel David Luzzatto. Torah Commentary. Translated and annotated by Eliyahu Munk, volume 3, pages 1043–59. New York: Lambda Publishers, 2012.
Samson Raphael Hirsch. The Jewish Sabbath. Frankfurt, before 1889. Translated by Ben Josephussoro. 1911. Reprinted Lexington, Kentucky: CreateSpace Independent Publishing Platform, 2014.
Yehudah Aryeh Leib Alter. Sefat Emet. Góra Kalwaria (Ger), Poland, before 1906. Excerpted in The Language of Truth: The Torah Commentary of Sefat Emet. Translated and interpreted by Arthur Green, pages 235–42. Philadelphia: Jewish Publication Society, 1998. Reprinted 2012.

Hermann Cohen. Religion of Reason: Out of the Sources of Judaism. Translated with an introduction by Simon Kaplan; introductory essays by Leo Strauss, pages 125, 127, 214, 217. New York: Ungar, 1972. Reprinted Atlanta: Scholars Press, 1995. Originally published as Religion der Vernunft aus den Quellen des Judentums. Leipzig: Gustav Fock, 1919.
Alexander Alan Steinbach. Sabbath Queen: Fifty-four Bible Talks to the Young Based on Each Portion of the Pentateuch, pages 116–19. New York: Behrman's Jewish Book House, 1936.
Julius H. Greenstone. Numbers: With Commentary: The Holy Scriptures, pages 127–64. Philadelphia: Jewish Publication Society, 1939. Reprinted by Literary Licensing, 2011.
Thomas Mann. Joseph and His Brothers. Translated by John E. Woods, page 577. New York: Alfred A. Knopf, 2005. Originally published as Joseph und seine Brüder. Stockholm: Bermann-Fischer Verlag, 1943.
Morris Adler, Jacob B. Agus, and Theodore Friedman. “Responsum on the Sabbath.” Proceedings of the Rabbinical Assembly, volume 14 (1950), pages 112–88. New York: Rabbinical Assembly of America, 1951. In Proceedings of the Committee on Jewish Law and Standards of the Conservative Movement 1927–1970, volume 3 (Responsa), pages 1109–34. Jerusalem: The Rabbinical Assembly and The Institute of Applied Hallakhah, 1997.

Abraham Joshua Heschel. The Sabbath. New York: Farrar, Straus and Giroux, 1951. Reprinted 2005.
Abraham Joshua Heschel. Man's Quest for God: Studies in Prayer and Symbolism, page 36. New York: Charles Scribner's Sons, 1954.
Raphael Loewe. "Divine Frustration Exegetically Frustrated — Numbers 14:34." In Words and Meanings: Essays Presented to David Winton Thomas. Edited by Peter R. Ackroyd and Barnabas Lindars, pages 137–58. Cambridge: Cambridge University Press, 1968.
Ivan Caine. “Numbers in the Joseph Narrative.” In Jewish Civilization: Essays and Studies: Volume 1. Edited by Ronald A. Brauner, page 4. Philadelphia: Reconstructionist Rabbinical College, 1979. ISSN 0191-3034..
Jacob Milgrom. "Of Hems and Tassels: Rank, authority and holiness were expressed in antiquity by fringes on garments." Biblical Archaeology Review, volume 9 (number 3) (May/June 1983).
Philip J. Budd. Word Biblical Commentary: Volume 5: Numbers, pages 140–78. Waco, Texas: Word Books, 1984.
Mayer Rabinowitz. "An Advocate's Halakhic Responses on the Ordination of Women." New York: Rabbinical Assembly, 1984. HM 7.4.1984a. In Responsa: 1980–1990: The Committee on Jewish Law and Standards of the Conservative Movement. Edited by David J. Fine, pages 722, 727, 733 note 28. New York: Rabbinical Assembly, 2005. (defining a minyan based on the community who heard the spies' evil report).
Joel Roth. "On the Ordination of Women as Rabbis." New York: Rabbinical Assembly, 1984. HM 7.4.1984b. In Responsa: 1980–1990: The Committee on Jewish Law and Standards of the Conservative Movement. Edited by David J. Fine, pages 736, 750, 782 note 82. New York: Rabbinical Assembly, 2005. (defining a minyan based on the ten spies who brought the evil report).
Pinchas H. Peli. “Pompous Delegation, Tragic End.” In Torah Today: A Renewed Encounter with Scripture, pages 169–72. Washington, D.C.: B'nai B'rith Books, 1987.
Phyllis Bird. “Harlot as Heroine: Narrative Art and Social Presupposition in Three Old Testament Texts,” Semeia, volume 46 (1989): pages 119–39. (Rahab).
Jacob Milgrom. The JPS Torah Commentary: Numbers: The Traditional Hebrew Text with the New JPS Translation, pages 100–28, 387–414. Philadelphia: Jewish Publication Society, 1990.
Yair Zakovitch. "Humor and Theology or the Successful Failure of Israelite Intelligence: A Literary-Folkloric Approach to Joshua 2." In Text and Tradition: The Hebrew Bible and Folklore. Edited by Susan Niditch, page 75. Atlanta: Scholars Press, 1990.
Baruch A. Levine. Numbers 1–20, volume 4, pages 345–402. New York: Anchor Bible, 1993.
Mary Douglas. In the Wilderness: The Doctrine of Defilement in the Book of Numbers, pages xix, 54, 59, 84, 88, 103, 106–07, 110–12, 121–26, 137, 145, 147, 150–51, 164, 188–90, 194, 201, 210, 212, 232. Oxford: Oxford University Press, 1993. Reprinted 2004.
Ilana Pardes. "Imagining the Promised Land: The Spies in the Land of the Giants." History & Memory, volume 6 (number 2) (Fall-Winter 1994): pages 5–23.
Peter Barnes. "Was Rahab's Lie a Sin?" Reformed Theological Review, volume 54 (number 1) (1995): pages 1–9.
Judith S. Antonelli. "Women and the Land." In In the Image of God: A Feminist Commentary on the Torah, pages 352–56. Northvale, New Jersey: Jason Aronson, 1995.
Ellen Frankel. The Five Books of Miriam: A Woman's Commentary on the Torah, pages 215–19. New York: G. P. Putnam's Sons, 1996.
W. Gunther Plaut. The Haftarah Commentary, pages 357–65. New York: UAHC Press, 1996.
Shoshana Gelfand. "May Women Tie Tzitzit Knots?" New York: Rabbinical Assembly, 1997. OH 14:1.1997. In Responsa: 1991–2000: The Committee on Jewish Law and Standards of the Conservative Movement. Edited by Kassel Abelson and David J. Fine, pages 3–8. New York: Rabbinical Assembly, 2002.
Sorel Goldberg Loeb and Barbara Binder Kadden. Teaching Torah: A Treasury of Insights and Activities, pages 248–53. Denver: A.R.E. Publishing, 1997.
Robert Goodman. “Shabbat.” In Teaching Jewish Holidays: History, Values, and Activities, pages 1–19. Denver: A.R.E. Publishing, 1997.
Susan Freeman. Teaching Jewish Virtues: Sacred Sources and Arts Activities, pages 85–101. Springfield, New Jersey: A.R.E. Publishing, 1999..
Lisa A. Edwards. "The Grasshoppers and the Giants." In The Women's Torah Commentary: New Insights from Women Rabbis on the 54 Weekly Torah Portions. Edited by Elyse Goldstein, pages 279–85. Woodstock, Vermont: Jewish Lights Publishing, 2000.
Dennis T. Olson. "Numbers." In The HarperCollins Bible Commentary. Edited by James L. Mays, pages 174–75. New York: HarperCollins Publishers, revised edition, 2000.
Francine Rivers. Unashamed: Rahab. Wheaton, Illinois: Tyndale House Publishers, 2000. (novel about Rahab).
Elie Kaplan Spitz. "Mamzerut." New York: Rabbinical Assembly, 2000. EH 4.2000a. In Responsa: 1991–2000: The Committee on Jewish Law and Standards of the Conservative Movement. Edited by Kassel Abelson and David J. Fine, pages 558, 562–63, 576, 580–81. New York: Rabbinical Assembly, 2002. (evolution of interpretation of visiting the sins of the father on the children, the punishment of Sabbath violation, and the blue thread of the tzitzit).

Lainie Blum Cogan and Judy Weiss. Teaching Haftarah: Background, Insights, and Strategies, pages 6–15. Denver: A.R.E. Publishing, 2002.
Louis H. Feldman. “Philo's Version of the Biblical Episode of the Spies.” Hebrew Union College Annual, volume 73 (2002): pages 29–48.
Michael Fishbane. The JPS Bible Commentary: Haftarot, pages 229–33. Philadelphia: Jewish Publication Society, 2002.
Tikva Frymer-Kensky. "The Guardian at the Door: Rahab." In Reading the Women of the Bible: A New Interpretation of Their Stories, pages 34–44. New York: Shocken Books. 2002,
Ari Greenspan. "The Search for Biblical Blue." Bible Review, volume 19 (number 1) (February 2003): pages 32–39, 52.
Alan Lew. This Is Real and You Are Completely Unprepared: The Days of Awe as a Journey of Transformation, pages 38–39, 41–43. Boston: Little, Brown and Co., 2003.
Rose Mary Sheldon. "Spy Tales." Bible Review, volume 19 (number 5) (October 2003): pages 12–19, 41–42.
Robert Alter. The Five Books of Moses: A Translation with Commentary, pages 745–61. New York: W.W. Norton & Co., 2004.
John Crawford. "Caleb the Dog: How a Biblical Good Guy Got a Bad Name." Bible Review, volume 20 (number 2) (April 2004): pages 20–27, 45.
Nili S. Fox. "Numbers." In The Jewish Study Bible. Edited by Adele Berlin and Marc Zvi Brettler, pages 309–15. New York: Oxford University Press, 2004.
Pamela Wax. "Haftarat Shelach Lecha: Joshua 2:1–24." In The Women's Haftarah Commentary: New Insights from Women Rabbis on the 54 Weekly Haftarah Portions, the 5 Megillot & Special Shabbatot. Edited by Elyse Goldstein, pages 175–79. Woodstock, Vermont: Jewish Lights Publishing, 2004.
Professors on the Parashah: Studies on the Weekly Torah Reading Edited by Leib Moscovitz, pages 249–54. Jerusalem: Urim Publications, 2005.
Frank Anthony Spina. "Rahab and Achan: Role Reversals." In The Faith of the Outsider: Exclusion and Inclusion in the Biblical Story, pages 52–71. William B. Eerdmans Publishing Company, 2005. (discussing the Haftarah).
Francine Rivers. The Warrior: Caleb. Wheaton, Illinois: Tyndale House Publishers, 2005. (novel about Caleb).
Aaron Wildavsky. Moses as Political Leader, pages 129–33. Jerusalem: Shalem Press, 2005.
W. Gunther Plaut. The Torah: A Modern Commentary: Revised Edition. Revised edition edited by David E.S. Stern, pages 977–1000. New York: Union for Reform Judaism, 2006.
Aaron Sherwood. “A Leader's Misleading and a Prostitute's Profession: A Re-examination of Joshua 2.” Journal for the Study of the Old Testament, volume 31 (number 1) (September 2006): pages 43–61. (haftarah).
Suzanne A. Brody. "I'm still groping" and "Espionage Reports." In Dancing in the White Spaces: The Yearly Torah Cycle and More Poems, pages 16, 96. Shelbyville, Kentucky: Wasteland Press, 2007.
Esther Jungreis. Life Is a Test, page 48. Brooklyn: Shaar Press, 2007.
James L. Kugel. How To Read the Bible: A Guide to Scripture, Then and Now, pages 159, 329–30, 332, 376. New York: Free Press, 2007.
Walter Brueggemann. Great Prayers of the Old Testament, pages 11–23. Louisville, Kentucky: Westminster John Knox Press, 2008. (prayer of ).
Tzvi Novick. "Law and Loss: Response to Catastrophe in Numbers 15." Harvard Theological Review, volume 101 (number 1) (January 2008): pages 1–14.
The Torah: A Women's Commentary. Edited by Tamara Cohn Eskenazi and Andrea L. Weiss, pages 869–92. New York: URJ Press, 2008.
Camille Shira Angel. "Ruach Acheret—Ruach Hakodesh/Different Spirit—Sacred Spirit: Parashat Shelach (Numbers 13:1–15:41)." In Torah Queeries: Weekly Commentaries on the Hebrew Bible. Edited by Gregg Drinkwater, Joshua Lesser, and David Shneer; foreword by Judith Plaskow, pages 199–201. New York: New York University Press, 2009.
R. Dennis Cole. "Numbers." In Zondervan Illustrated Bible Backgrounds Commentary. Edited by John H. Walton, volume 1, pages 358–63. Grand Rapids, Michigan: Zondervan, 2009.
Reuven Hammer. Entering Torah: Prefaces to the Weekly Torah Portion, pages 213–18. New York: Gefen Publishing House, 2009.
Carolyn J. Sharp. “Rahab the Clever.” In Irony and Meaning in the Hebrew Bible, pages 97–103. Bloomington, Indiana: Indiana University Press, 2009.
Tessa Afshar. Pearl in the Sand. Chicago: Moody Publishers, 2010. (novel about Rahab).
Jonathan P. Burnside. “'What Shall We Do with the Sabbath-Gatherer?' A Narrative Approach to a 'Hard Case' in Biblical Law (Numbers 15:32–36).” Vetus Testamentum, volume 60 (number 1) (2010): pages 45–62.
Julie Cadwallader-Staub. Joy. In Face to Face: A Poetry Collection. DreamSeeker Books, 2010. ("land of milk and honey").
Howard J. Curzer. “Spies and Lies: Faithful, Courageous Israelites and Truthful Spies.” Journal for the Study of the Old Testament, volume 35 (number 2) (December 2010): pages 187–95.
Idan Dershowitz. “A Land Flowing with Fat and Honey.” Vetus Testamentum, volume 60 (number 2) (2010): pages 172–76.
Terence E. Fretheim. "Numbers." In The New Oxford Annotated Bible: New Revised Standard Version with the Apocrypha: An Ecumenical Study Bible. Edited by Michael D. Coogan, Marc Z. Brettler, Carol A. Newsom, and Pheme Perkins, pages 208–13. New York: Oxford University Press, Revised 4th Edition 2010.
The Commentators' Bible: Numbers: The JPS Miqra'ot Gedolot. Edited, translated, and annotated by Michael Carasik, pages 90–114. Philadelphia: Jewish Publication Society, 2011.
Jonah Kain. Spies in the Promised Land. Amazon Digital Services, 2011. (novel about Caleb).
Joe Lieberman and David Klinghoffer. The Gift of Rest: Rediscovering the Beauty of the Sabbath. New York: Howard Books, 2011.
Calum Carmichael. The Book of Numbers: A Critique of Genesis, pages 54–89. New Haven: Yale University Press, 2012.

William G. Dever. The Lives of Ordinary People in Ancient Israel: When Archaeology and the Bible Intersect, page 46. Grand Rapids, Michigan: William B. Eerdmans Publishing Company, 2012.
Shmuel Herzfeld. "Finding Happiness in Front of Us." In Fifty-Four Pick Up: Fifteen-Minute Inspirational Torah Lessons, pages 209–15. Jerusalem: Gefen Publishing House, 2012.
Chanan Morrison. The Splendor of Tefillin: Insights into the Mitzvah of Tefillin From the Writings of Rabbi Abraham Isaac HaKohen Kook. CreateSpace Independent Publishing Platform, 2012.
Daniel S. Nevins. "The Use of Electrical and Electronic Devices on Shabbat." New York: Rabbinical Assembly, 2012.

Shlomo Riskin. Torah Lights: Bemidbar: Trials and Tribulations in Times of Transition, pages 89–126. New Milford, Connecticut: Maggid Books, 2012.
Adam Kirsch. "Ancient Laws for Modern Times: When is a tent just a tent and not like a bed or a hat? To update Jewish laws, the rabbis reasoned by analogy." Tablet Magazine. (February 26, 2013). (Shabbat).
Adam Kirsch. "Leave the Jewish People Alone: Rabbis left enforcement of their Talmudic decrees to communal standards and voluntary commitment." Tablet Magazine. (March 5, 2013). (Shabbat).
Adam Kirsch. "Written in the Stars (Or Not): To overcome fated lives, the Talmud's rabbis argued, perform virtuous acts according to Torah." Tablet Magazine. (March 12, 2013). (Shabbat).
Adam Kirsch. "Navigating the Talmud's Alleys: The range of problems and the variety of answers in the study of Oral Law lead to new pathways of reasoning." Tablet Magazine. (March 18, 2013). (Shabbat).
DovBer Pinson. Tefillin: Wrapped in Majesty. Brooklyn: IYYUN Publishing, 2013.
Amiel Ungar. "Tel Aviv and the Sabbath." The Jerusalem Report, volume 24 (number 8) (July 29, 2013): page 37.
Anthony J. Frendo. "Was Rahab Really a Harlot?" Biblical Archaeology Review, volume 39 (number 5) (September/October 2013): pages 62–65, 74–76.
Amanda Terkel. "Glenn Grothman, Wisconsin GOP Senator, Fights for a Seven-Day Workweek." The Huffington Post. (January 3, 2014, updated January 23, 2014). (Congressional candidate said, "Right now in Wisconsin, you're not supposed to work seven days in a row, which is a little ridiculous because all sorts of people want to work seven days a week.")
Ester Bloom. "The Crazy New App For Using Your iPhone on Shabbos."  Jewniverse. (October 1, 2014).
"The Crazy New Invention for Using Electricity on Shabbat."  Jewniverse. (April 21, 2015).

Jonathan Sacks. Lessons in Leadership: A Weekly Reading of the Jewish Bible, pages 199–203. New Milford, Connecticut: Maggid Books, 2015.
Avivah Gottlieb Zornberg. Bewilderments: Reflections on the Book of Numbers, pages 119–69. New York: Schocken Books, 2015.
David Booth, Ashira Konigsburg, and Baruch Frydman-Kohl. “Modesty Inside and Out: A Contemporary Guide to Tzniut,” page 11. New York: Rabbinical Assembly, 2016. ( and moderating that at which we gaze).
"The Hittites: Between Tradition and History." Biblical Archaeology Review, volume 42 (number 2) (March/April 2016): pages 28–40, 68.
Jonathan Sacks. Essays on Ethics: A Weekly Reading of the Jewish Bible, pages 233–37. New Milford, Connecticut: Maggid Books, 2016.
Kenneth Seeskin. Thinking about the Torah: A Philosopher Reads the Bible, pages 135–52. Philadelphia: The Jewish Publication Society, 2016.
Shai Held. The Heart of Torah, Volume 2: Essays on the Weekly Torah Portion: Leviticus, Numbers, and Deuteronomy, pages 124–35. Philadelphia: Jewish Publication Society, 2017.
Steven Levy and Sarah Levy. The JPS Rashi Discussion Torah Commentary, pages 123–26. Philadelphia: Jewish Publication Society, 2017.
Pekka Pitkänen. “Ancient Israelite Population Economy: Ger, Toshav, Nakhri and Karat as Settler Colonial Categories.” Journal for the Study of the Old Testament, volume 42 (number 2) (December 2017): pages 139–53.
Jonathan Sacks. Numbers: The Wilderness Years: Covenant & Conversation: A Weekly Reading of the Jewish Bible, pages 145–84. New Milford, Connecticut: Maggid Books, 2017.
Andrew Tobolowsky. "The Problem of Reubenite Primacy: New Paradigms, New Answers." Journal of Biblical Literature, volume 139, number 1 (2020): pages 27–45.
Jaeyoung Jeon. "The Scout Narrative (Numbers 13) as a Territorial Claim in the Persian Period." Journal of Biblical Literature, volume 139, number 2 (2020): pages 255–74.

External links

Texts
Masoretic text and 1917 JPS translation
Hear the parashah chanted
Hear the parashah read in Hebrew

Commentaries

Academy for Jewish Religion, California
Academy for Jewish Religion, New York 
Aish.com 
Akhlah: The Jewish Children's Learning Network
Aleph Beta Academy
American Jewish University — Ziegler School of Rabbinic Studies
Anshe Emes Synagogue, Los Angeles 
Ari Goldwag
Ascent of Safed
Bar-Ilan University 
Chabad.org
eparsha.com
G-dcast
The Israel Koschitzky Virtual Beit Midrash
Jewish Agency for Israel
Jewish Theological Seminary
Kabbala Online
Mechon Hadar
Miriam Aflalo 
MyJewishLearning.com
Ohr Sameach
Orthodox Union
OzTorah, Torah from Australia
Oz Ve Shalom — Netivot Shalom
Pardes from Jerusalem
Professor James L. Kugel
Professor Michael Carasik
Rabbi Dov Linzer
Rabbi Fabian Werbin
Rabbi Jonathan Sacks
RabbiShimon.com 
Rabbi Shlomo Riskin
Rabbi Shmuel Herzfeld
Rabbi Stan Levin
Reconstructionist Judaism 
Sephardic Institute 
Shiur.com
613.org Jewish Torah Audio
Suzanne A. Brody
Tanach Study Center
TheTorah.com
Torah from Dixie 
Torah.org
TorahVort.com
Union for Reform Judaism
United Synagogue of Conservative Judaism
What's Bothering Rashi?
Yeshiva University
Yeshivat Chovevei Torah

Weekly Torah readings in Sivan
Weekly Torah readings from Numbers